Ramanagar is a village in Belgaum district of Karnataka, India.

Demographics

2011

References

Villages in Belagavi district